Agra is a Galician and Portuguese surname, most frequently found in Brazil and the Rías Baixas area of Spain. Notable people with the surname include:

 Alberto Agra, Filipino former acting Secretary of Justice
 Alfonso Agra, Spanish actor
 Bruno Agra, Brazilian musician
 Carmen Agra Deedy, Cuban-American children's author
 Maria de Fátima Agra, Brazilian botanist
 Nélson Agra, Portuguese footballer
 Salvador Agra, Portuguese footballer

References

Galician-language surnames
Portuguese-language surnames